Presečno (in older sources also Presično) is a settlement in the Municipality of Dobje in eastern Slovenia. The area is part of the traditional region of Styria. It is now included in the Savinja Statistical Region.

References

External links
Presečno on Geopedia

Populated places in the Municipality of Dobje